759 Vinifera (prov. designation:  or ) is a large background asteroid from the central regions of the asteroid belt, approximately  in diameter. It was discovered on 26 August 1913, by German astronomer Franz Kaiser at the Heidelberg-Königstuhl State Observatory in southwest Germany. The dark X-type asteroid has a rotation period of 14.2 hours and a heavily elongated shape. It was named after the plant species vitis vinifera, also known as the common grape vine.

Orbit and classification 

Vinifera is a non-family asteroid of the main belt's background population when applying the hierarchical clustering method to its proper orbital elements. It orbits the Sun in the central asteroid belt at a distance of 2.1–3.2 AU once every 4 years and 3 months (1,548 days; semi-major axis of 2.62 AU). Its orbit has an eccentricity of 0.21 and an inclination of 20° with respect to the ecliptic. The body's observation arc begins with its official discovery observation by Franz Kaiser at the Heidelberg Observatory on 26 August 1913.

Naming 

This minor planet was named after the plant vitis vinifera, the common grape vine, to honor the discoverer's ancestors who were winemakers. The  was mentioned in The Names of the Minor Planets by Paul Herget in 1955.

Physical characteristics 

In the Bus–Binzel SMASS classification, Vinifera is an X-type asteroid.

Rotation period 

In September 2002, a rotational lightcurve of Vinifera was obtained from photometric observations by Maurice Clark at the Goodsell Observatory  in Minnesota. Lightcurve analysis gave a well-defined rotation period of  hours with a brightness variation of  magnitude.

Diameter and albedo 

The Collaborative Asteroid Lightcurve Link derives an albedo of 0.0500 and a diameter of 45.07 kilometers based on an absolute magnitude of 10.6.

These timed observations are taken when the asteroid passes in front of a distant star.

References

External links 
 Lightcurve Database Query (LCDB), at www.minorplanet.info
 Dictionary of Minor Planet Names, Google books
 Asteroids and comets rotation curves, CdR – Geneva Observatory, Raoul Behrend
 Discovery Circumstances: Numbered Minor Planets (1)-(5000) – Minor Planet Center
 
 

000759
Discoveries by Franz Kaiser
Named minor planets
000759
19130826